Eight-wheel drive, often notated as 8WD or 8×8, is a drivetrain configuration that allows all eight wheels of an eight-wheeled vehicle to be drive wheels (that is, to receive power from the engine) simultaneously. Unlike four-wheel drive drivetrains, the configuration is largely confined to heavy-duty off-road and military vehicles, such as armored vehicles, tractor units or all-terrain vehicles such as the Argo Avenger.

Operation
When such a vehicle only has eight wheels by definition all are driven. When it has twelve – with two pairs of ganged "dual" wheels on each rear axle – all are also driven but the 8×8 designation remains. Very occasionally, on the Sterling T26 for example, the two front axles can be fitted with ganged "dual" wheels. For most military applications where traction/mobility are considered more important than payload capability, single wheels on each axle (often referred to as super singles) are the norm. On some vehicles, usually recovery trucks or heavy tractor units, the rear two axles will have wider single tires than the front two axles.

Heavy hauler and ballast tractor 8×8s have had a long history as prime movers both in the military (as tank transports and artillery tractors), and commercially in logging and heavy equipment hauling both on- and off-road.
Most eight-wheel drive trucks have two forward axles and two at the rear, with only the front pair steering. Occasionally a single front axle and three rear (tridem) are seen, an example being the Oshkosh M1070 tank transporter. In such configurations, the front and rear axle usually steer. Other set ups include that of the ZIL-135.

Many wheeled armored vehicles have an 8x8 driveline, and on these the axles (which usually have independent suspension) are more evenly spaced. Latest generation 8x8 wheeled armored vehicles have steering on the rearmost (fourth) axle to improve mobility in urban and confined situations.

In the case of both truck and armored vehicle applications, drive may be limited to the rear two axles for on-road use, this reducing driveline stress and tire wear, and increasing fuel efficiency.

Gallery

See also
 H-drive
 Six-wheel drive
 Four-wheel drive
 6x4 (drivetrain)
 Driveline windup

References

External links

 
Car layouts